William Alanson (by 1519 – 1554/55 or later), of Lincoln, was an English Member of Parliament.

He was appointed Sheriff of Lincoln for 1540–41 and elected Mayor of Lincoln for 1542–43. He gained the rank of Alderman in 1542 which he kept until his death.

He was a Member (MP) of the Parliament of England for Lincoln in 1542.

References

Year of birth missing
1550s deaths
Year of death unknown
Members of the Parliament of England (pre-1707) for Lincoln
Mayors of Lincoln, England
English MPs 1542–1544